The Women's Malaysian Open Squash Championships 2011 is the women's edition of the 2011 Malaysian Open Squash Championships, which is a tournament of the WSA World Series event Gold (prize money: $68,500). The event took place in Kuala Lumpur in Malaysia from 20 July to 23 July. Nicol David won her seventh Malaysian Open trophy, beating Jenny Duncalf in the final.

Prize money and ranking points
For 2011, the prize purse was $68,500. The prize money and points breakdown is as follows:

Seeds

Draw and results

See also
WSA World Series 2011
Malaysian Open Squash Championships
Men's Malaysian Open Squash Championships 2011

References

External links
WSA Malaysian Open Squash Championships website
WISPA Malaysian Open Squash Championships website
CIMB Kuala Lumpur Nicol David Open 2011 Squashsite website

Squash tournaments in Malaysia
Kuala Lumpur Open Squash Championships
2011 in Malaysian sport
2011 in women's squash